The Thomas J. Watson Foundation is a charitable trust formed 1961 in honor of former chairman and CEO of IBM, Thomas J. Watson. The Foundation's stated vision is to empower students “to expand their vision, test and develop their potential, and gain confidence and perspective to do so for others.” The Watson Foundation operates two programs, the Thomas J. Watson Fellowship and the Jeannette K. Watson Fellowship.

The two programs were based in Providence and New York City, but in 2006 the two fellowships were united in New York.

In 2018 the Watson Foundation celebrated its 50th Anniversary. The Foundation moved into its new offices in New York's Woolworth Building that same year.

Thomas J. Watson Fellowship 
The Thomas J. Watson Fellowship is a grant that enables graduating seniors to pursue a year of independent study outside the United States. 1968 was the Fellowship's first year, providing graduates with a year to "explore with thoroughness a particular interest, test their aspirations and abilities, view their lives and American society in greater perspective and, concomitantly, develop a more informed sense of international concern". In 2018, the fellowship celebrated its 50th anniversary. In that time, over 42,000 students submitted applications, and nearly 2,000 fellowships were awarded, making the fellowship similarly selective to the Rhodes or Marshall Scholarships. Unlike those programs, only undergraduates in their senior year at 41 colleges are eligible to apply.

Background
The fellowship itself grants recipients money to spend one year traveling in pursuit of their projects. Recipients are forbidden from reentering the United States and their home country for one year.  Projects are not academically oriented, as the fellowship is intended to encourage exploration and new experiences rather than formal research. Currently the award is $36,000 per fellow or $46,000 for a fellow traveling with a spouse or dependent. The stipend also provides student loan repayment for the duration of the fellowship. The Watson Foundation emphasizes that the grant is an investment in a person rather than a project. During their travels the Fellows remain unaffiliated with a college or university, instead planning and administering their projects themselves.  They are barred from working on a paying job, and are discouraged from joining organized volunteer projects for substantial periods of time.

Selection criteria
Qualities sought in fellows include: Leadership, Imagination, Independence, Emotional Maturity, Courage, Integrity, Resourcefulness, and Responsibility. Institutions eligible to nominate Watson Fellows are 41 select small liberal arts colleges with an undergraduate population of fewer than 3,000 students:

Notable Watson Fellows

Layla AbdelRahim,  comparatist anthropologist and author
David Abram, cultural ecologist and philosopher
Jay Allison, independent public radio producer
Nancy Bekavac, former president of Scripps College
Iram Parveen Bilal, filmmaker and entrepreneur
Kai Bird, Pulitzer Prize–winning author and columnist
Lynn J. Bush, American Federal Senior Judge
Gloria Borger, CNN political commentator
Ian Boyden, painter
Roberto Castillo, novelist, short fiction writer, translator and essayist
Peter Child, professor of music at MIT and composer in residence with the New England Philharmonic
Tom Cole, U.S. Congressman from Oklahoma
Nicolas Collins,  composer of mostly electronic music
Howard Fineman, Huffington Post and MSNBC political analyst
John Garang, late Commander-in-Chief of the Sudanese People's Liberation Army and Vice-President of Sudan
Yishay Garbasz, Artist and Activist.
David Grann, American journalist and best-selling author
Aracelis Girmay, American poet
Alia Gurtov, American paleoanthropologist
Dan Hammer, environmental economist and winner of the inaugural Pritzker Award
Tori Haring-Smith, president of Washington & Jefferson College
Corey Harris, blues and reggae musician and MacArthur Fellow.
Garrett Hongo, Pulitzer-nominated poet and academic
Barbara Higbie, jazz and traditional musician
Edward Hirsch, poet, president of the John Simon Guggenheim Memorial Foundation
Jackie Diamond Hyman, American novelist and reporter
Pat Irwin, composer, musician, and former member of the B-52s
Cleveland Johnson, Director, National Music Museum
Mat Johnson, writer
Ian Kerner, New York Times bestselling author
Raffi Khatchadourian, American journalist
Verlyn Klinkenborg, author and Guggenheim Fellow
Jimmy J. Kolker, U.S. Ambassador to Uganda (2002-5) and Burkina Faso (1999-2002)
Chris Kratt, Host of Wild Kratts and other educational nature shows
Edwin M. Lee, mayor of San Francisco
Joe Lewis, former dean of UC Irvine Claire Trevor School of the Arts
Jason Mantzoukas, actor and writer
Mark Stephen Meadows, American artist and entrepreneur
Jonathan Meiburg, lead singer and principal songwriter for the band Shearwater
Michael Noer, executive news editor at Forbes
 Dan O'Brien, playwright and poet
John Payton, civil rights attorney
Peggy Pettitt, American actor, dancer, and storyteller
Steve Raichlen, BBQ chef, author, and PBS cooking show host
Eric Rosengren, President and CEO of the Federal Reserve Bank of Boston
 (Suzanne Seriff), Folklorist, cultural anthropologist, museum curator
Caroline Shaw, 2013 Pulitzer Prize for music
David Shipley, The New York Times Op-Ed Editor
John Siceloff, American television producer
Alan Solomont, U.S. Ambassador to Spain (2009 - 2013)
Julie Taymor, Oscar-nominated, Emmy- and Tony Award-winning director
Francisco Valero-Cuevas, engineer and scientist
Reetika Vazirani, American/Indian poet
Madhuri Vijay, novelist, author of The Far Field
Eileen Wilson-Oyelaran, President of Kalamazoo College

Directors of the Thomas J. Watson Fellowship

Chris Kasabach, 2011-Present
Cleveland Johnson, 2008-2011
Rosemary Macedo, 2006-2008
Beverly J. Larson, 2003-2006
Norv Brasch, 2001-2003
Tori Haring-Smith, 1999-2001
Noreen C. Tuross, 1997-1999
William F. L. Moses, 1995-1997
James A. Lehman, 1993-1995 
Mary E. Brooner, 1991-1993
Steven V. Licata, 1989-1991
Martin A. Brody, 1987-1989
Nancy Y. Bekavac, 1985-1987
Joseph V. Long III, 1883-1985
Jeanne C. Olivier, 1981-1983
David C. Summers, 1979-1981
John C. Elder, 1977-1979
Daniel L. Arnaud, 1972-1977
Robert O. Schulze, Founding Director, 1968-1972

Jeannette K. Watson Fellowship 
In 1999, the Jeannette K. Watson Fellowship was created to expose undergraduate students to work through three successive summer internships and mentorship. The fellowship is a competitive academic grant made each year to fifteen undergraduates nominated by 12 affiliated New York City colleges which provides successive summer experiences for three years, stipends, mentoring, seminars, and discovery fund.

The fellowship is named after Jeannette K. Watson, the first female member of the IBM Board of Directors, and wife of Thomas J. Watson.

During their first summer, Jeannette K. Watson Fellows intern at a New York City based partner, while the second and third summers can be in New York City, anywhere else in the United States, or overseas. Over the three year fellowship, fellows must go overseas at least once. Fellows are awarded three successive annual grants of $5,500, $6,500, $7,000 in addition to a $2,000 discovery fund. Fellows have gone on to win prestigious awards like the Harry S. Truman Scholarship, the Fulbright Program, and The Paul & Daisy Soros Fellowships for New Americans. They have also gone on to graduate school at the University of Oxford, Harvard University, and the University of California, Los Angeles.

Selection criteria
Qualities sought include high standards, ambition, openness, desire to explore diverse cultures and new professional fields, willingness to act on feedback, leadership, ability to work in groups, integrity and accountability, and a strong academic record. The following 12 partnering colleges nominate up to four candidates to be considered in a citywide selections process.

Eligible institutions
Baruch College
Brooklyn College
City College of New York
College of Staten Island
Hunter College
John Jay College
Lehman College
Long Island University, Brooklyn Campus
Marymount Manhattan College
Pace University Manhattan
St. John's University
Queens College

History
The Fellowship was established by the Thomas J. Watson Foundation in 1999.  Its founding Director, the late Alice Stone Ilchman, former President of Sarah Lawrence College and Elizabeth Buckner, former Board of Advisors member, developed the original idea for the Fellowship and began working with eight colleges. Frank Wolf, its second director, served from 2006 until his retirement in 2012. Dean Emeritus of the School of Continuing Education at Columbia University, Wolf extended participation to four additional New York City colleges and expanded substantially the Fellowship's internships in the for-profit sector.  In 2012 the Foundation combined the directorships of its two programs with the appointment of Chris Kasabach as the Executive Director of the Thomas J. Watson Foundation.

Directors the Jeannette K. Watson Fellowship

Sara Nolfo, 2016–present
Frank Wolf, 2006-2012
Alice Ilchman, Founding Director, 1999-2006

References

External links
Official Site

1961 establishments in New York (state)
Charitable trusts
Scholarships in the United States
Education in New York City
Internship programs